is the 29th single by Japanese singer Yōko Oginome. Written by Toyohisa Araki, the single was released on August 21, 1993 by Victor Entertainment.

Background and release
The song is an adaptation of "Romance Anónimo", a traditional Spanish guitar piece that was made famous as the main theme of the 1952 French film Forbidden Games. It was used by Nissan for their Laurel commercial.

The B-side, "Kuroi Hitomi", is an adaptation of "Dark Eyes", a traditional Russian romance song that was made famous by Julio Iglesias as the song "Nathalie".

"Romance" peaked at No. 47 on Oricon's singles chart and sold over 33,000 copies.

Track listing
All lyrics are written by Toyohisa Araki, all music is arranged by Edison.

Charts

References

External links

1993 singles
Yōko Oginome songs
Japanese-language songs
Victor Entertainment singles